BGC may refer to:

Organisations
 BGC Partners, a financial services company, New York City, US
 Bankgirocentralen, Sweden, operators of the Bankgirot system
 Baptist General Conference, US
 Bard Graduate Center, Bard College, New York City, US
 Berkeley Geochronology Center, California, US
 Black Girls Code, providing technology education to African-American girls 
 Buckeridge Group of Companies, construction, Western Australia

Mass media
 Bad Girls Club, US TV show 2006 to 2017

Other uses
 Background garbage collection, in flash memory
 Bonifacio Global City, Taguig, Metro Manila, Philippines
BGC, the surname of the French Class B 81500 (for dual-mode AGC or in French, Bi-mode AGC)